Peter Nicholas Kyros (July 11, 1925 – July 10, 2012) was an American attorney, politician, and lobbyist who served as a Democratic U.S. representative from Maine from 1967 to 1975.

Early life and education
Born in Portland, Maine, to Greek immigrants, Kyros attended the Portland Public Schools completed an engineering program at the Massachusetts Institute of Technology. He earned a bachelor's degree from the United States Naval Academy in 1947 and a law degree from Harvard Law School in 1957.

Career
Kyros served in the United States Navy from 1944 to 1953 and was discharged with rank of lieutenant. He was admitted to the bar in 1957 and commenced the practice of law in Portland, Maine. From 1957 to 1959, Kyros served as counsel to the Maine Public Utilities Commission.

Congress 
Kyros was elected as a Democrat to the Ninetieth and to the three succeeding Congresses (January 3, 1967 – January 3, 1975). He was an unsuccessful candidate for reelection in 1974 to the Ninety-fourth Congress, narrowly losing to Republican nominee David Emery, and tried unsuccessfully to regain the seat in 1976.

Later career 
He served in the United States Department of State from 1980 to 1982.

Kyros resumed the practice of law in Washington, D.C., lobbying "for several firms active on Capitol Hill, advocating for scientific and medical research".

Personal life
Kyros died on July 10, 2012.

External links

References

1925 births
2012 deaths
20th-century American politicians
American people of Greek descent
Harvard Law School alumni
Lawyers from Washington, D.C.
Maine lawyers
Massachusetts Institute of Technology alumni
Politicians from Portland, Maine
United States Naval Academy alumni
United States Navy officers
Democratic Party members of the United States House of Representatives from Maine
20th-century American lawyers

Members of Congress who became lobbyists

United States Navy personnel of World War II